FC Gigant Grozny was a Russian football team from Grozny. It played professionally from 1992 to 1994. Their best result was 14th place in Zone 1 of the Russian Second Division in 1993.

Team name history
 1992–1993 – FC Urartu Grozny
 1994 – FC Gigant Grozny

External links
  Team history at KLISF

Association football clubs established in 1992
Association football clubs disestablished in 1995
Defunct football clubs in Russia
Sport in Grozny
1992 establishments in Russia
1995 disestablishments in Russia